Gail Galloway Adams (born 1943) is an American short story writer, and editor.

Life
She grew up in Central Texas.

She taught at West Virginia University, retiring in 2008. 
She edited Arts & Letters.

Her work appeared in Kenyon Review, The Georgia Review, North American Review, Story Quarterly.

She lives in Morgantown, West Virginia.

Awards
 1988 Flannery O'Connor Award for Short Fiction
 1994 West Virginia Professor of the Year from the Carnegie Foundation for the Advancement of Teaching

Works

Anthologies

References

American short story writers
Writers from Texas
Living people
1943 births
West Virginia University faculty